Chen Astrogo (born 25 February 1990) is an Israeli former professional tennis player.

Born in Holon, Astrogo was a right-handed player, who was small in stature at 1.56 m. She featured in the junior draw of the 2008 Australian Open and won four ITF doubles titles while competing on the professional tennis circuit.

Astrogo represented Israel in a 2010 Fed Cup tie against the Netherlands in Lisbon, Portugal. She played in the dead rubber doubles with Karen Shlomo, which they lost to Richèl Hogenkamp and Nicole Thyssen.

ITF finals

Singles: 1 (0–1)

Doubles: 7 (4–3)

See also
List of Israel Fed Cup team representatives

References

External links
 
 
 

1990 births
Living people
Israeli female tennis players
Sportspeople from Holon
21st-century Israeli women